The Eau Claire Masonic Center, also known as the Temple of Free Masonry, is a historic Masonic building located at 616 Graham Avenue in Eau Claire, Wisconsin. It was built in 1927 in the Neoclassical architectural style and was listed on the National Register of Historic Places in 1988.

The building was designed by Edward J. Hancock and contains  of floor space, including an auditorium, ballroom, dining room, meeting rooms, and offices.  It served historically as a meeting hall for Masonic orders. Since the mid-1990s it has also been the rain/rehearsal site for the Eau Claire Municipal Band.

References

Neoclassical architecture in Wisconsin
Masonic buildings completed in 1927
Buildings and structures in Eau Claire, Wisconsin
Masonic buildings in Wisconsin
Clubhouses on the National Register of Historic Places in Wisconsin
National Register of Historic Places in Eau Claire County, Wisconsin